Route 774 is a  long mostly north–south secondary highway on Campobello Island in Charlotte County, New Brunswick, Canada.

Route description
The route's northern terminus is northeast of the community of Head Harbour near Head Harbour Island. The road travels southwest through Head Harbour, past Pollock Cove, and into Wilsons Beach. From here, the route passes several coves including Curry Cove, Otter Cove (near the village of Otter Cove), Clarks Cove and Conroy Cove. It passes the east bank of Harbour de Lute, turns east, and enters Welshpool on Friars Bay.  The route then continues south past Herring Cove Provincial Park, Snug Cove, Roosevelt Campobello International Park, and finally Union Cove before ending at the Franklin Delano Roosevelt Bridge at the Canada–US border continuing on as Maine State Route 189.

History

See also

References

External links

774
774